In 2001, the Madagascar Ministry of Environment and Forests, in collaboration with the Wildlife Conservation Society (WCS), launched a program to create the 372,470 ha Makira Forest Protected Area. Formally established in 2012, Makira Natural Park (IUCN Category II) is one of the largest of Madagascar’s protected areas and encompasses 372,470 hectares of strictly protected forest buffered by more than 350,000 hectares of community-managed forests. The Makira Natural Park is managed by WCS on behalf of the Government of Madagascar under a delegated management contract.

The Makira forests represent one of the largest expanses of humid forest left in the biologically rich eastern rainforest biome of Madagascar. Makira is estimated to contain around 50% of Madagascar’s floral biodiversity and harbors the highest lemur diversity in the country with 17 species. Particularly notable is the occurrence of 3 critical endangered lemur species, the Silky Sifaka (Propithecus candidus), the Indri (Indri indri) and the Black and White Vari (Varecia variegata subcincta). In addition to a remarkable density of 17 lemurs species, a total of 57 mammals species have been recorded to date, including the Fossa (Cryptoprocta ferox), the Falanouc (Eupleres goudotii) and 13 species of tenrecs.

As for birds a total of 125 birds species have been described of which 75 are endemic to Madagascar making the Makira Natural Park to one of Madagascar's Hotspot Areas for bird conservation (Ganzhorn et al., 1997). For example, 10 Vanga species occur in Makira, including the Bernier's vanga (Oriolia bernieri) with the highest density of all of Madagascar.

The Makira forests are a key, intact biodiversity stronghold and a vital bridge maintaining connectivity across protected areas in the region including Masoala National Park and Marojejy National Park, (which are both included in the Rainforests of Atsinanana UNESCO World Heritage Site), Anjanaharibe-Sud Special Reserve, Marotandrano Special Reserve and Mananara National Park. Additionally the Makira forests support the terrestrial and marine livelihoods of thousands of households and protect their means of subsistence by protecting the watersheds, by preventing flooding of plains, and in reducing the sedimentation of the downstream Antongil bay.

Calculating the Economic Value of Rainforest Preservation: Botanical Ethnomedicines
Researchers at Harvard University Center for the Environment, Madagascar Health and Environmental Research, University of California and Maroantsetra District Public Hospital calculated the economic value of botanical ethnomedicines in the Makira Protected Area and estimated mean benefits of ethnomedicines per year at approximately US$5.40–7.90 per person, $30.20–44.30 per household, and between $756,050 and $1,110,220 for all residents. Regarding potential value of the Makira rainforest area through the lens of commercial pharmaceutical development, based on a calculation of 1 to 18 potentially novel drugs derived from ethnomedicines used in the area, and using current average sales value of novel FDA-approved pharmaceuticals, the author estimated that the protected area “could hold between $316 million to almost $6 billion of untapped revenue within its botanical diversity.”

See also
 Illegal logging in Madagascar

References

External links
 , Code REDD
 ,  Ministère de l'Environnement et des Forêts
 

Protected areas of Madagascar
Protected areas established in 2005
Madagascar lowland forests